Crippling Lack is a 2016 album by British folk singer and guitarist David Thomas Broughton. The album was released in three volumes with three labels in three countries. The labels are Edinburgh's Song, By Toad (Vol.1), Lens’ LeNoizeMaker (Vol.2) and New York City's Paper Garden (Vol.3).

Track listing 

 "Crippling Lack, Pt. 1" - 4:05
 "Beast" - 5:49
 "Words of Art" (feat. Aidan Moffat) - 7:19
 "Silent Arrow" - 9:19
 "Dots" - 9:22
 "River" (feat. Sam Amidon) - 3:52
 "Concrete Statement" - 13:34
 "I Close My Eyes" - 16:17
 "Crippling Lack, Pt. 2" - 9:35
 "Gulf" (feat. Jordan Geiger) - 5:39
 "Beast Without You" (feat. Beth Orton) - 6:34
 "Plunge of the Dagger" (feat. Luke Drozd) - 9:32

David Thomas Broughton albums
2016 albums